Chrostosoma haematica is a moth of the subfamily Arctiinae. it was described by Maximilian Perty in 1834. It is found in Ecuador and Brazil.

References

"Bibliography for Chrostosoma haematica". Biodiversity Heritage Library.
"Bibliography for Chrostosoma decisa Walker 1864". Biodiversity Heritage Library.

Chrostosoma
Moths described in 1834
Taxa named by Maximilian Perty